The Worsted Act 1776 (17 Geo 3 c 11) was an Act of the Parliament of Great Britain.

The whole Act was repealed by section 1(1) of, and Part XIII of Schedule 1 to, the Statute Law (Repeals) Act 1986.

References
Halsbury's Statutes,

Great Britain Acts of Parliament 1776